Delio Hernández Valadés (born 16 September 1956) is a Mexican politician formerly from the Labor Party and the Social Democratic Party. From 2006 to 2009 he served as Deputy of the LX Legislature of the Mexican Congress representing Colima.

References

1956 births
Living people
Politicians from Colima
Labor Party (Mexico) politicians
Social Democratic Party (Mexico) politicians
21st-century Mexican politicians
Deputies of the LX Legislature of Mexico
Members of the Chamber of Deputies (Mexico) for Colima